European Grand Circuit was a harness racing series arranged by European Trotting Union. It was held from 1956 to 2011. The competition was replaced by UET Masters Series in 2012. 

The circuit consisted of the major European harness racing events, such as Elitloppet, Prix de France, Gran Premio Lotteria and Oslo Grand Prix. In 2011 14 races from seven countries were included.

Winners 1956–2011

Sources 
Winners of the European Grand Circuit at Sukuposti.net

References 

Harness racing in Europe